Farkhana (Tarifit: Farxana, ⴼⴰⵔⵅⴰⵏⴰ; Arabic:  فرخانة) is a town in Nador Province, Oriental, Morocco.  According to the 2004 census, it has a population of 10,994.

References

Populated places in Nador Province